Sébastien Da Silva (born 8 April 1991) is a French professional footballer who plays as a forward for Laval.

Career
Da Silva began playing football with FC Souvigny and moved to the academy of Moulins at the age of 10, and began his senior career with the club in 2009. He had a stint with Mulhouse for the 2014–15 season, before moving to Rodez for three years. He followed that up with a spell at Fréjus Saint-Raphaël. He spent the 2020–21 season with Bastia, and helped them win the 2020–21 Championnat National and achieve promotion. He was controversially left out of the Bastia side after their promotion, and he transferred to Laval on in the summer of 2021. He then helped Laval win the 2021–22 Championnat National, and again achieved promotion to the Ligue 2. He made his professional debut against his old club Bastia in a 2–0 Ligue 2 win on 30 July 2022, coming on as a substitute in extra time.

Personal life
Da Silva was born in France and is of Portuguese descent. His best friend is the French footballer Jason Berthomier.

Honours
Bastia
Championnat National: 2020–21

Laval
Championnat National: 2021–22

References

External links
 

1991 births
Living people
People from Orange, Vaucluse
French footballers
French people of Portuguese descent
AS Moulins players
FC Mulhouse players
Rodez AF players
ÉFC Fréjus Saint-Raphaël players
SC Bastia players
Stade Lavallois players
Ligue 2 players
Championnat National players
Championnat National 2 players
Championnat National 3 players
Association football forwards